MSC Virtuosa is a Meraviglia-Plus-class cruise ship owned and operated by MSC Cruises. Built by Chantiers de l'Atlantique in Saint-Nazaire, France, she is the second ship in the Meraviglia-Plus class and sister ship to MSC Grandiosa. Originally scheduled to debut on 8 November 2020, her delivery and entry into service was delayed due to the COVID-19 pandemic. She was delivered to MSC Cruises on 1 February 2021 and entered service in May 2021.

History

Construction 
On 2 February 2016, MSC Cruises announced that they had converted their options for two new ships into firm orders, with the new vessels being a part of a sub-class that evolves from the cruise line's original Meraviglia-class platform, dubbed "Meraviglia Plus". Each new vessel was designed to be larger than their older Meraviglia-class sisters, at 181,000 GT, with a maximum passenger capacity of 6,334 guests.

On 14 June 2018, MSC Cruises celebrated the steel-cutting for the second Meraviglia Plus-class vessel and also announced her name as MSC Virtuosa at the Chantiers de l'Atlantique shipyard. Her coin ceremony was performed on 27 February 2019. She was floated out on 29 November 2019 and moved to a wet dock to complete construction.

Debut 
MSC Virtuosa was originally scheduled to be delivered in October 2020 and sail her maiden voyage on 8 November 2020 from Genoa. Due to the COVID-19 pandemic, construction delays arose at the shipyard and slowed the ship's construction progress. The delivery took place on 1 February 2021 with a traditional flag ceremony at the Chantiers de l'Atlantique shipyard. She entered service on 20 May 2021 sailing from Southampton.

Operational career 
MSC Virtuosa was scheduled to begin sailing weekly itineraries in the Western Mediterranean in autumn 2020. However, due to the construction delays, MSC Grandiosa replaced all of the ship's scheduled itineraries through the winter 2020–2021 season. She entered service on 20 May 2021 with a series of three and four-night cruises from Southampton, before beginning seven-night cruises around the British Isles on 12 June with three embarkation ports in England and Scotland. These cruises sailed to ports such as Portland, Liverpool, Greenock and Belfast and are exclusively for UK residents. She was originally scheduled to cruise in Northern Europe and the Baltic region for the spring 2021 season, however these cruises were operated by MSC Seaview instead. She re-positioned to Dubai in Autumn 2021, where she was based throughout the winter, sailing 7-day itineraries in the Persian Gulf to the UAE, Qatar, Saudi Arabia and Oman.

In 2022, MSC Virtuosa returned back to Southampton for a summer season from May until November 2022. Whilst in Southampton she will perform 2-14 night cruises to regions including Northern Europe, Baltics, Norwegian Fjords and the Canary Islands.

Southampton is her main embarkation port during the season, with additional embarkation ports of Malaga, Spain and Lisbon, Portugal. In August 2022 it was announced MSC Virtuosa will be based in Southampton year-round and into summer 2023.

Design and engineering 
Like MSC Grandiosa, MSC Virtuosa will be equipped with a selective catalytic reduction system that helps to reduce nitrogen oxide emissions by 80 percent, along with a closed-loop exhaust gas cleaning system that reduces ship sulfur emissions by 97 percent. She will also be capable of running on shorepower when docked at ports.

References 

Virtuosa
Ships built in France
2019 ships